Prasad Dias (born 15 August 1977) was a Sri Lankan cricketer who played for Colts Cricket Club. He was born in Colombo.

Dias made a single first-class appearance for the side, during the 1995–96 season, against Sebastianites. From the tailend, he scored a duck in the only innings in which he batted.

External links
Prasad Dias at CricketArchive 

1977 births
Living people
Sri Lankan cricketers
Colts Cricket Club cricketers
Cricketers from Colombo
20th-century Sri Lankan people